The Lippisch Delta VI was a proposed single-seat, twin-jet experimental delta flying wing aircraft begun in 1943 by German designer Alexander Lippisch, as the developed version of the P.11 bomber project begun while he was still working for Messerschmitt in 1942. The only prototype was destroyed in June 1944 while still under construction.

Design and development

P.11 bomber for Messerschmitt
During 1942, while still working on the Messerschmitt Me 163 rocket fighter, Alexander Lippisch conceived a larger but similarly tailless bomber with twin jet engines buried in a thick wing, designated P.11.

P.11 flying-wing fighter
Following his departure for his own independent design office near Vienna in Austria, Lippisch returned to the P.11 and radically revised it. The fuselage shrank to a short forward cockpit nacelle. The engines were placed quite close together inside the wing, with intakes in the roots and the otherwise straight trailing edge cut back for the exhausts. The wing planform was a cropped delta of moderate sweep. Small twin fins were located either side of the trailing edge cutback. Construction of a full-scale mock-up began in 1943.

Delta VI
By the time work on an experimental prototype was begun, the project had become the Delta VI. Around this time Lippisch conceived of a "power wing", a hollow monocoque shell whose interior formed the internal duct of the main powerplant. He initially intended the Delta VI to have such a wing construction, but later drawings suggest that this was too difficult to realise under the prevailing war conditions.

On 16 and 24 June 1944 the USAF bombed Vienna, destroying the factory where prototype V1 was under construction and killing over forty of his co-workers. The prototype was moved to a new site but could not be completed before the Russian arrival in Vienna caused Lippisch and his colleagues to flee.

Lippisch went on to further develop the power wing concept in his P.12 and P.13a and b projects.

Specifications (P.11 fighter)

See also

References

Notes

Bibliography
 Sharp, Dan; Luftwaffe: Secret jets of the Third Reich, Mortons 2015.

External links
Browse Items (318 total) for Alexander Lippisch, Lippisch papers, Iowa Heritage Digital Collection. Includes images of Delta VI/P.11 during construction.

1940s German experimental aircraft
jet aircraft
Tailless delta-wing aircraft
Abandoned military aircraft projects of Germany
Delta VI